Caroline Garcia and Kristina Mladenovic were the defending champions, but chose not to participate this year. 

Raquel Atawo and Jeļena Ostapenko won the title, defeating Abigail Spears and Katarina Srebotnik in the final, 6–4, 6–4.

Seeds

Draw

Draw

References
 Main Draw

Porsche Tennis Grand Prixandnbsp;- Doubles
2017 Doubles